was a concert tour by Japanese singer Misia and the eighth installment of the Hoshizora Live concert series. The tour began on April 11, 2015 at Aichi Prefectural Art Theater in Nagoya, Aichi and concluded on October 20, 2015 at Festival Hall in Osaka, Osaka, comprising 37 shows.

Background
On December 22, 2014, Misia announced she would embark on the eighth Hoshizora Live tour with a list of 33 dates in 18 different cities. The tour subtitle Moon Journey was revealed on January 16, 2015. Ticket sales opened to the general public on March 8, 2015. With a purchase of both the double A-side CD single "Shiroi Kisetsu" / "Sakura Hitohira" and the video album Sekai Isan Gekijō Misia Candle Night at Okinawa, fans were offered a chance to win two backstage passes to one of Misia's shows. Two additional dates for July 2015 were announced on March 16, 2015. On June 17, 2015, it was announced that Michiko Shimizu would appear as a special guest at the two dates in Tokyo.

On July 24, 2015, Misia announced through her official website and social media the cancellation of the July 25, 2015 Sunport Hall Takamatsu show due to illness. On July 27, 2015, the cancelled date was rescheduled for October 17, 2015, at the same venue. Two additional dates, one at Naruto Bunka Kaikan in Naruto, Tokushima, and another at Festival Hall in Osaka, Osaka were announced.

Set list
This set list is representative of the concert on July 7, 2015. It does not represent all concerts for the duration of the tour.

"Sakura Hitohira"
"Hi no Ataru Basho"
"Royal Chocolate Flush"
"Mekubase no Blues" ("The Winking Blues")
"Ashita wa Motto Suki ni Naru" ("Love You More Tomorrow")
"Mayonaka no Hide-and-seek" ("Midnight Hide-and-seek")
"Aitakute Ima" (Acoustic version)
"Everything"
"Hana" ("Flower")
"Shiroi Kisetsu"
"Koi no Boogie Oogie Train" ("Boogie Oogie Love Train") (Ann Lewis cover)
"Luv Parade" (Soul Mix version)
"Color of Life"
"Re-Brain"
"Hope & Dreams"
Encore
"Anata ni Smile :)"
"Nagareboshi"

Shows

Cancelled shows

Personnel
Band
 Misia – lead vocals
 Tohru Shigemi – keyboard
 Shūhei Yamaguchi – guitar
 Satoshi Yoshida - guitar
 Jino – bass
 Tomo Kanno – drums
 Hanah Spring - backing vocals
 Lyn - backing vocals
 Yuho - backing vocals

References

External links
 

2015 concert tours
Misia concert tours
Concert tours of Japan